The Hancock County School District is a public school district in Hancock County, Georgia, United States, based in Sparta. It serves the communities of Culverton, Mayfield and Sparta.

Schools
The Hancock County School District has one elementary school, one middle school, and one high school.

Elementary school
Lewis Elementary School

Middle school
Hancock Central Middle School

High school
Hancock Central High School

References

External links

School districts in Georgia (U.S. state)
Education in Hancock County, Georgia